Abe Stern (March 8, 1888 – July 12, 1951) was an American film producer.  He produced 542 films between 1917 and 1929. He was a co-founder of Universal Studios.

He was born in Fulda, Germany, and died in Los Angeles County, California.  He was the brother of producer Julius Stern and the brother-in-law of Universal Studios co-founder Carl Laemmle. He was entombed at Home of Peace Cemetery.

Selected filmography
 Business Before Honesty (1918)
 Hello Trouble (1918)
 Painless Love (1918)
 The King of the Kitchen (1918)
 Hop, the Bellhop (1919)
 The Freckled Fish (1919)
 Lions and Ladies (1919)
 Hearts in Hock (1919)
 Laughing Gas (1920)

External links

 

1888 births
1951 deaths
American film producers
German emigrants to the United States